Balaji Narasimhan (born 19 May 1987) is a retired Indian football goalkeeper, who represented India national team and debuted against Brunei in a 5–0 win on 20 May 2001.

External links 

Bio

Indian footballers
India international footballers
1977 births
Living people
Footballers from Bangalore
I-League players
I-League 2nd Division players
National Football League (India) players
Mohun Bagan AC players
Pune FC players
Hindustan Aeronautics Limited S.C. players
Association football goalkeepers